A Robertson screw, also known as a square screw or Scrulox, is a type of screw with a square-shaped socket in the screw head and a corresponding square protrusion on the tool. Both the tool and socket have a slight taper. Originally designed to enable the screws to be made using cold forming of the heads, the taper has two other advantages which have helped popularize it: it makes inserting the tool easier, and helps keep the screw on the tool without the user having to hold it there. The Robertson screw is specified as ANSI Type III Square Center.

Usage and design 

Robertson screws are commonplace in Canada, though they have been used in other countries and are becoming much more common. As patents expired and awareness of their advantages have spread, Robertson fasteners have become popular in woodworking and general construction. Combination Robertson/Phillips drives are often used in the electrical trade, particularly for device and circuit breaker terminals, as well as clamp connectors.

Robertson screwdrivers are easy to use one-handed, because the tapered socket tends to retain the screw, even if it is shaken. They also allow the use of angled screwdrivers and trim-head screws. The socket-headed Robertson screws are self-centering and reduce cam out. They also stop a power tool when set, and can be more easily removed if painted over, or old and rusty. In industry, they speed up production and reduce product damage.

History

Background 
The internal-drive square socket for screws (as well as the corresponding triangular socket drive) had been conceived several decades before the invention of the Robertson screw and driver. An earlier patent covering both square-socket- and triangle-socket-drive wood screws, was issued to Allan Cummings of New York City on March 30, 1875. As with other drive types conceived and patented in the 1860s through 1890s, it was not manufactured widely during its patent lifespan due to the difficulty and expense of doing so.

Invention 
P. L. Robertson invented the Robertson screw and screwdriver in 1906 and received the Canadian patent in 1907 (CA103387) and US patent 1911 for a manufacturing machine. His breakthrough in 1908 was to design the socket's taper and proportions in such a combination that the heads could be easily and successfully cold formed, making such screws a valuable commercial proposition. Today, cold forming (stamping in a die) is still their most common fabrication method, although rotary broaching is also common. Linear broaching, cutting corners into a drilled hole (similar to the action of a mortising machine for woodworking) has also been used over the decades.

Licensing 

When Henry Ford tried the Robertson screws, he found that they saved considerable time in Model T production. When Robertson refused to license the design, Ford realized that the supply of screws would not be guaranteed, and chose to limit their use to his Canadian division.

Nüvo drive system 
A new variation of the Robertson drive is the Nüvo drive system. Its screws are compatible with Robertson drive tools, but have rounded lobes that, when used with Nüvo drivers, "dramatically reduce wobbling and stripping out, enabling single-handed operation".

Combination Screws for Electrical Applications 
Many screw heads used in electrical applications (e.g., a typical NEMA 5-15R, breaker screws, and conduit screws) use a combination of a slotted/Phillips/Robertson bit.  A few tool manufacturers make bits to engage this screw head better than the traditional Phillips allowing for more torque before camout, e.g., the C1 & C2 from Klein and the ECX #1 & #2 from Milwaukee.

References 

Mechanical standards
Screws